Óscar González Rodríguez (born 13 September 1951) is a Mexican politician who served as PRI member of the Chamber of Deputies in the LVII Legislature of the Mexican Congress from September 1997 to August 2000. He was educated at the Monterrey Institute of Technology and Higher Education (Economics, 1972) and the University of East Anglia where he graduated with a Masters in Economics and a PhD entitled "Political economy of the Mexican agrarian structure".

References

1951 births
Living people
Alumni of the University of East Anglia
Members of the Chamber of Deputies (Mexico)
Institutional Revolutionary Party politicians